Moriba Kemessia Jah (born 1971) is an American space scientist and aerospace engineer who describes himself as a "space environmentalist", specializing in orbit determination and prediction, especially as related to space situational awareness and space traffic monitoring. He is currently an associate professor of Aerospace Engineering and Engineering Mechanics at the University of Texas at Austin. Jah previously worked as a spacecraft navigator at the NASA Jet Propulsion Laboratory, where he was a navigator for the Mars Global Surveyor, Mars Odyssey, Mars Express, Mars Exploration Rover, and his last mission was the Mars Reconnaissance Orbiter. He is a Fellow of the American Astronautical Society, the Air Force Research Laboratory, the International Association for the Advancement of Space Safety and, the Royal Astronomical Society. Jah was also selected into the 10th anniversary class of TED Fellows and was named a MacArthur Fellow in 2022. He also was selected into the AIAA class of Fellows and Honorary Fellows in the year of the 50th Anniversary of Apollo 11. The AIAA "confers the distinction of Fellow upon individuals in recognition of their notable and valuable contributions to the arts, sciences or technology of aeronautics and astronautics."

Early life and education 

Jah was born in San Francisco, California to Elsie Turnier from Port-Au-Prince, Haiti and Abraham Jah from Pujehun, Sierra Leone. Jah's parents divorced when he was two years old. He moved to Venezuela at the age of six. Jah studied at the Cap(f) Pedro Ma. Ochoa Morales National Guard military high school in Venezuela.

After graduating, Jah moved back to the United States and enlisted in the United States Air Force where he served as a Security Policeman.

Following his enlistment, he studied Aerospace Engineering at Embry–Riddle Aeronautical University in Prescott Arizona and earned a bachelor's degree in 1999. He was inspired to become an astrodynamicist by Ron Madler. As an undergraduate student, Jah was awarded a NASA space grant, which allowed him to investigate lunar gravity assist trajectories for Earth orbit plane changes.

He spent a year at the Los Alamos National Laboratory working on space mission design.

He spent two years at Microcosm, performing the orbital analysis for several satellite constellations.

He went to the University of Colorado Boulder for his graduate studies, earning a master's in 2001 and PhD, under the supervision of George Born, in 2005. During his PhD he worked at the Jet Propulsion Laboratory as a navigation engineer, developing the navigation algorithms and performing orbit determination for several missions, including the Mars Global Surveyor, Mars Odyssey and Mars Exploration Rover. His doctoral thesis looked at aerobraking spacecraft, using an Unscented Kalman Filter to estimate the spacecraft trajectory and explore this as a possible way to automate aerobraking operations.

In 2006, Jah left NASA JPL and became a Senior Scientist at Oceanit Laboratories on Maui, where he used optical data to determine space trajectories. He was awarded the NASA Space Act Award "for the creative development of a scientific contribution which has been determined to be of significant value in the advancement of the space and aeronautical activities of NASA, and is entitled: Inertial Measurements for Aero-assisted Navigation (IMAN)" in 2007.

Career 
In 2007 Jah joined the Air Force Research Laboratory (AFRL).  He directed the AFRL Advanced Sciences and Technology Research Institute for Astronautics (ASTRIA) in Maui from 2007 to 2010 and then at Kirtland Air Force Base in New Mexico until 2014. At Kirtland Air Force Base Jah was made mission lead in Space Situational Awareness and advised the satellite guidance and control program.

He left the AFRL in 2016 to become an associate professor at the University of Arizona. He served as director of the University of Arizona's Space Object Behavioral Sciences initiative. Here he developed techniques to track and understand the more than 23,000 human-made objects that are inside Earth's orbit, of which only ≈ 1,500 are operational.

In 2017, Jah joined the Department of Aerospace Engineering and Engineering Mechanics at the University of Texas at Austin. He is interested in non-gravitational astrodynamics and using big data in astrodynamics through a Resource Description Framework. He is building models of space debris that look to quantify the space object population.

Jah is concerned because the United States Strategic Command cannot accurately track all satellites, and their current data could be biased, noisy and corrupt. He gave formal congressional testimony to the Federal government of the United States in 2017, discussing a Civil Space Traffic Management system. He believes that we should create a global, accessible, and transparent space traffic management system, which would protect spacecraft from debris and a lack of monitoring.

Jah has served as a member of the delegation at the United Nations Committee on the Peaceful Uses of Outer Space and chairs the NATO SCI-279-TG activity on Space Domain Awareness. He was appointed as Core Faculty to the University of Texas at Austin Institute for Computational Engineering and Sciences in 2018 where he directs the Computational Astronautical Sciences and Technologies group (a.k.a. The CAST). He has discussed astrodynamics and space policy on NPR, the BBC as well as featuring in the National Geographic.

At the University of Texas at Austin, Jah is also a Distinguished Scholar of the Robert S. Strauss Center for International Security and Law. Jah's research interests are focused upon the detection, tracking, identification, and characterization of resident space objects. The goal is to quantify, assess, and predict the behavior of all resident space objects, both natural and human-made. Jah's published works span the areas of space situational awareness, space traffic management, spacecraft navigation, space surveillance and tracking, multi-source information fusion, and more recently the intersection with space security and safety. He has previously served as Associate Editor of the IEEE Transactions on Aerospace and Electronic Systems and is currently for the Elsevier Advances in Space Research.

In 2021, Jah co-founded Privateer Space with Steve Wozniak and Alex Fielding, where he serves as Chief Scientist.

Personal life 
Jah first married Maria Renee Washington in 1991. In 1999, he divorced Washington, and married Cassaundra Renea Shafer in 2002.

Awards and recognition
Jah's work has been featured in Nature, Popular Science, and National Geographic. He was elected to the International Academy of Astronautics in July 2018.

References

External Links 
 

MacArthur Fellows
Living people
21st-century American engineers
Fellows of the American Institute of Aeronautics and Astronautics
Fellows of the Royal Astronomical Society
American aerospace engineers
African-American scientists
University of Colorado alumni
University of Texas at Austin faculty
People from San Francisco
Embry–Riddle Aeronautical University alumni
Air Force Research Laboratory people
Jet Propulsion Laboratory faculty
1971 births
TED (conference)
Wired (magazine) people
Space scientists
21st-century African-American people
20th-century African-American people